Mytilaria is a genus of flowering plants belonging to the family Hamamelidaceae.

Its native range is Southern China to Northern Indo-China.

Species
Species:
 Mytilaria laosensis Lecomte

References

Hamamelidaceae
Saxifragales genera